The  is a professional wrestling tag team  championship contested for in the Japanese promotion Wrestle Association R, and later Dragon Gate and Tenryu Project. This title was the first tag team championship in Japan dedicated to junior heavyweight wrestlers.

There have been twenty-two reigns (including one unrecognized) shared among twenty-one teams and thirty-three individuals. The current champions are Kenichiro Arai and Rey Paloma.

Title history
The title was created in Wrestle Association R (WAR) on February 23, 1996, when Fuyuki-gun (Gedo and Lionheart) defeated Lance Storm and Yuji Yasuraoka in a tournament final. It was deemed inactive in 2000 when WAR folded, and was later revived by Dragon Gate on August 8, 2006. The I-J belts would be unified with the new Dragon Gate Open the Twin Gate Championship, a tag title made specifically for Dragon Gate, on October 12, 2007. In September 2010, the championship was reactivated by Tenryu Project.

Reigns

Combined reigns

By team

By wrestler

See also
IWGP Junior Heavyweight Tag Team Championship
GHC Junior Heavyweight Tag Team Championship
NWA International Lightweight Tag Team Championship

References

Notes

Footnotes

External links
Wrestling-Titles.com

Dragon Gate (wrestling) championships
WAR (wrestling promotion) championships
Junior heavyweight wrestling championships
Tag team wrestling championships
Tenryu Project championships